New Love may refer to:

"New Love", song by Dua Lipa from her self-titled album, 2015
"New Love" (Silk City song), song by Silk City featuring Ellie Goulding, 2021
New Love (Former Ghosts album), 2010
New Love (B'z album), 2019
New Love (Metro album), a 1979 album by Metro
"New Love", song from the film Beach Blanket Bingo performed on screen by Jackie Ward and lip-synced by Linda Evans
"New Love", song by Cherrelle from High Priority, 1989
"New Love", song by Donna Loren, 1965
"New Love", song by Glenn Frey from The Allnighter, 1984
"New Love", song by Jeffrey Osborne from his self-titled album, 1982
"New Love", song by the Arches featuring Karen Harding, 2015
"New Love", song by Marie Osmond from I Only Wanted You, 1986
"New Love", song by The Muffs, 1991
"New Love", song by Stanley Jordan from Magic Touch, 1985
"New Love", song by Voxtrot from their self-titled album, 2007
"New Love", song by Maroon 5 from V

See also 
 Newlove (disambiguation)